The 1940 Arkansas gubernatorial election was held on November 5, 1940.

Incumbent Democratic Governor Carl E. Bailey was defeated in the Democratic primary.

Democratic nominee Homer Adkins defeated Republican nominee Harley C. Stump with 91.36% of the vote.

Democratic primary

The Democratic primary election was held on August 13, 1940.

Candidates
The anti-Bailey "federal faction" coalesced around Homer Adkins in early 1940. Loathing the idea of turning the statehouse over to Adkins, Bailey decided to break Arkansas tradition and seek a third term.

Declared
Homer Adkins, U.S. Internal Revenue collector for Arkansas
Carl E. Bailey, incumbent Governor
J. Rosser Venable, attorney
Frank Witte, merchant

Declined
Bob Bailey, Lieutenant Governor of Arkansas
Jack Holt, Attorney General of Arkansas
John L. McClellan, United States House of Representatives for Arkansas's 6th congressional district

Results

General election

Candidates
Homer Adkins, Democratic
Harley C. Stump, mayor of Stuttgart. Stump was nominated at the Republican State Convention on May 11, 1940.
Walter Scott McNutt, Independent, candidate for Governor in 1938

Results

References

Bibliography
 
 
 

1940
Arkansas
Gubernatorial
November 1940 events